The Ruth and Robert Hatch Jr. House is a historic house at 309 Bound Brook Way in Wellfleet, Massachusetts.  It is one of a modest number of surviving houses in Wellfleet that combine elements of Modern architecture with traditional Cape Cod architecture.   This single story wood-frame house was built in 1961 on Bound Brook Island to a design by local architect Jack Hall.  Extremely rustic in appearance, its exterior is sheathed in vertical boards and its windows have working shutters but no glass, resulting in a sharply vertical appearance.  The structure consists of three rectangular sections of different sizes that are based on modular 7' by 7' squares; the main public living space is 35' by 49', the master bedroom is 7' by 21', and the guest bedrooms are in a block that is 7' by 14' (enlarged from the original 7' by 7' in 1978).  The house, which is within the bounds of the Cape Cod National Seashore, was sold by the Hatches to the National Park Service, but they retain occupancy rights.

The house was listed on the National Register of Historic Places in 2014.

See also
National Register of Historic Places listings in Barnstable County, Massachusetts
National Register of Historic Places listings in Cape Cod National Seashore

References

Houses in Barnstable County, Massachusetts
Wellfleet, Massachusetts
Modernist architecture in Massachusetts
National Register of Historic Places in Cape Cod National Seashore
Houses completed in 1961
Houses on the National Register of Historic Places in Barnstable County, Massachusetts